Roy Jacobsen (born 26 December 1954) is a Norwegian novelist and short-story writer. Born in Oslo, he made his publishing début in 1982 with the short-story collection Fangeliv (Prison Life), which won Tarjei Vesaas' debutantpris. He is winner of The Norwegian Critics Prize for Literature and two of his novels have been nominated for The Nordic Council's Literature Prize: Seierherrene (The Conquerors) in 1991 and Frost in 2004. The Burnt-Out Town of Miracles was published in Britain in 2008. Jacobsen lives in Oslo.

Early life and authorship 
Jacobsen grew up in a suburb of Oslo located in the Groruddalen valley. In his teens, Jacobsen was a member of the criminal "Årvoll gang". At age 16 he was arrested by the police and kept in solitary confinement for 35 days. He was subsequently convicted of among other things weapons offences and theft, and given a six-month suspended sentence.

He has held a number of occupations, even subsequent to his debut as a novelist in 1982. Since 1990 he has been a full-time author. From 1979 to 1986 he lived at his mother's homestead at Solfjellsjøen in the municipality of Dønna in the northern Norwegian county of Nordland, and both the background of his mother as well as his own upbringing in Groruddalen were central themes of his breakthrough novel Seierherrene from 1991.

He is a member of the Norwegian Academy for Language and Literature.

Bibliography 
Fangeliv -  short stories (1982)
Hjertetrøbbel -  novel (1984)
Tommy -  novel (1985)
Det nye vannet -  novel (1987) (English 1997: The new water)
Virgo -  novel (1988)
Det kan komme noen -  short stories (1989)
Ursula -  barnebok (1990)
Seierherrene -  novel (1991)
Fata Morgana -  novel (1992)
Den høyre armen -  short stories (1994)
Trygve Bratteli. En fortelling -  biography of Trygve Bratteli (1995)
Ismael - novel (1998)
Grenser -  novel (1999) (English 2015: Borders)
Fugler og soldater -  short stories (2001)
Det nye vinduet -  short stories (2002)
Frost -  novel (2003)
Hoggerne - novel (2005) (English 2007: The Burnt-Out Town of Miracles)
Marions slør - novel (2007)
Vidunderbarn - novel (2009) (English 2011: Child Wonder)
De Usynlige - novel (2013) (English 2016: The Unseen)
Hvitt hav - novel (2015) (English 2019: White Shadow)
Rigels øyne - novel (2017) (English 2020: Eyes of the Rigel)
På randen av Vigeland - autobiography (2019)
Mannen som elsket Sibir - novel (2019)
Bare en mor - novel (2020)
De uverdige - novel (2022)

Prizes 
Tarjei Vesaas' debutantpris 1982, for Fangeliv
Cappelen Prize 1987 
Notabeneprisen 1988
Kritikerprisen 1989, for Det kan komme noen
Bokhandlerprisen 1991, for Seierherrene
Scheiblers legat 1991
Ivar Lo-prisen 1994
Oslo bys kunstnerpris 1994
Riksmålsforbundets litteraturpris 2003
Gyldendalprisen 2005
Ungdommens kritikerpris 2006

References

External links
Publisher's profile
Times Literary Supplement review of The Burnt-Out Town of Miracles, by Paul Owen

1954 births
Living people
Writers from Oslo
20th-century Norwegian novelists
21st-century Norwegian novelists
Norwegian biographers
Male biographers
Gang members
Norwegian prisoners and detainees
Prisoners and detainees of Norway
Members of the Norwegian Academy
Norwegian Critics Prize for Literature winners
Norwegian male novelists
20th-century Norwegian male writers
21st-century Norwegian male writers